Louis-Alphonse de Valbelle (1640–1708) was a French Roman Catholic Bishop.

Biography

Early life
Louis-Alphonse de Valbelle was born in 1640 in Marseille. His father was Antoine de Valbelle. He had a brother, Léon de Valbelle de Montfuron.

Career
He served as the Bishop of Alet from 1677 to 1684 and as Bishop of Saint-Omer from 1684 to 1708.

Death
He died in 1708 in Saint-Omer.

References

1640 births
1708 deaths
Roman Catholic clergy from Marseille
Provencal nobility
17th-century French Roman Catholic bishops
Bishops of Saint-Omer
Bishops of Alet